Nyctimantis is a genus of frogs in the family Hylidae. The genus is found in south-eastern Brazil as well as in the Orinoco Basin in Venezuela, Colombia, and Brazil. These are tree-dwelling species usually hiding in the cisterns of epiphytic bromeliads. The top of the head carries a bony plate which is fused with the skin.

Species
The following species are recognised in the genus Nyctimantis:

References

  (1970b): The evolutionary relationships of casque-headed treefrogs with co-ossified skulls (family Hylidae). - Univ. Kansas Publ. Mus. Nat. Hist. 18, pp. [547-716]

External links
  taxon Aparasphenodon at http://www.eol.org.
  Taxon Aparasphenodon at https://web.archive.org/web/20160606043808/http://www.itis.gov/index.html. (Accessed: Apr 24, 2008).
  Taxon Aparasphenodon at https://web.archive.org/web/20080501142231/http://data.gbif.org/welcome.htm

Hylidae
Amphibians of South America
Amphibian genera
Taxa named by Alípio de Miranda-Ribeiro